Jürgen Kühling (27 April 1934 – 16 December 2019) was a German judge, born in Osnabrück. He was a judge in the Federal Constitutional Court of Germany between 1989 and 2001.

References

20th-century German judges
Jurists from Lower Saxony
Justices of the Federal Constitutional Court
1934 births
2019 deaths
People from Osnabrück